Mãe Negra is a Portuguese language poem written by Angolan poet Alda Lara. Portuguese singer Paulo de Carvalho recorded it as a song.

Angolan literature